Tackaberry is a surname. Notable people with the surname include:

George Tackaberry (1874–1937), Canadian boot maker
John Tackaberry (1912–1969), American radio and television writer
Thomas Tackaberry (1923–2017), United States Army general

See also
Tackaberry Airport, an airport in St. Clair County, Michigan, United States